Bănică is a Romanian surname. Notable people with the surname include:

Andreea Bănică (born 1978), singer
Andrei Bănică (born 1977), rower
Nicuşor Bănică (born 1984), football player
Ștefan Bănică Sr. (1933–1995), actor and singer
Ștefan Bănică Jr. (born 1967), actor
Theodora Bănică (born 1988), model from Luxembourg
Andreea Marin (born 1974), formerly known as Andreea Marin Bănică, television presenter

Romanian-language surnames